The 2019–20 season was the 110th season in existence of Brescia Calcio. They returned to Serie A for the first time since 2010–11.

On 18 August, Brescia were eliminated in the third round of the Coppa Italia by Perugia.

Players

Squad information
Last updated on 9 February 2020
Appearances include league matches only

Transfers

In

Loans in

Out

Loans out

Pre-season and friendlies

Competitions

Serie A

League table

Results summary

Results by round

Matches

Coppa Italia

Statistics

Appearances and goals

|-
! colspan=14 style=background:#DCDCDC; text-align:center| Goalkeepers

|-
! colspan=14 style=background:#DCDCDC; text-align:center| Defenders

|-
! colspan=14 style=background:#DCDCDC; text-align:center| Midfielders

|-
! colspan=14 style=background:#DCDCDC; text-align:center| Forwards

|-
! colspan=14 style=background:#DCDCDC; text-align:center| Players transferred out during the season

Goalscorers

Last updated: 22 February 2020

Clean sheets

Last updated: 9 February 2020

Disciplinary record

Last updated: 9 February 2020

References

Brescia Calcio seasons
Brescia